King Toffa I (c.1850-1908) was a ruler of the kingdom of Họgbonu, or Ajase, an area of Benin which today is known as Porto-Novo.

Upon becoming ruler in 1874, he was renowned for his openness and cooperation with the colonial powers. He encouraged his employees to attend French schools to receive western education and was also tolerant of Islam and Christianity entering the country and coexisting with traditional endogenous religions such as Animism or Orisha. However, the alliance between Toffa I and the kings of Abomey was never successful. He established the Order of the Black Star in 1889. The palace which he lived in, located in Porto-Novo, is now a royal museum, providing a valuable insight into royal life during his reign. A statue of Toffa is located in Porto-Novo.

References

People from Porto-Novo
1908 deaths
1850s births
19th-century monarchs in Africa